On the Bondage of the Will (literally, "On Un-free Will", or "Concerning Bound Choice"), by Martin Luther, argued that people can only achieve salvation or redemption through God, and could not choose between good and evil through their own willpower. It was published in December 1525. It was his reply to Desiderius Erasmus' De libero arbitrio diatribe sive collatio or On Free Will, which had appeared in September 1524 as Erasmus' first public attack on Luther. The debate between Luther and Erasmus is one of the earliest of the Reformation over the issue of free will and predestination.

Arguments of Erasmus 

Despite his own criticisms of contemporary Roman Catholicism, Erasmus argued that it needed reformation from within and that Luther had gone too far. He held that all humans possessed free will and that the doctrine of predestination conflicted with the teachings of the Bible.

Erasmus argued against the belief that God's foreknowledge of events caused those events, and he held that the doctrines of repentance, baptism and conversion depended on the existence of free will. He likewise contended that divine grace merely assisted humans in coming to the knowledge of God by supporting them as they used their free will to make choices between good and evil, which in turn could lead to salvation through the atonement of Jesus Christ.

Content of Luther's response
Luther's response was to reason that original sin incapacitates human beings from working out their own salvation, and that they are completely incapable of bringing themselves to God. As such, there is no free will for humanity because any will they might have is overwhelmed by the influence of sin. Central to his analysis, both of the doctrines under discussion and of Erasmus' specific arguments, are Luther's beliefs concerning the power and complete sovereignty of God.

Luther concluded that unredeemed human beings are dominated by obstructions; Satan, as the prince of the mortal world, never lets go of what he considers his own unless he is overpowered by a stronger power, i.e. God. When God redeems a person, he redeems the entire person, including the will, which then is liberated to serve God. No one can achieve salvation or redemption through their own willpower—people do not choose between good or evil, because they are naturally dominated by evil, and salvation is simply the product of God unilaterally changing a person's heart and turning them to good ends. Were it not so, Luther contended, God would not be omnipotent and omniscient and would lack total sovereignty over creation. He also held that arguing otherwise was insulting to the glory of God. As such, Luther concluded that Erasmus was not actually a Christian.

Erasmus' rebuttal
In early 1526, Erasmus replied to this work with the first part of his two-volume Hyperaspistes, but this was a long and complex work which did not gain much popular recognition.

Luther's later views on his writings
Luther was proud of his On the Bondage of the Will, so much so that in a letter to Wolfgang Capito written on 9 July 1537, he said:Regarding [the plan] to collect my writings in volumes, I am quite cool and not at all eager about it because, roused by a Saturnian hunger, I would rather see them all devoured. For I acknowledge none of them to be really a book of mine, except perhaps the one On the Bound Will and the Catechism.

Notes

English translations
Luther, Martin. The Bondage of the Will: A New Translation of De Servo Arbitrio (1525), Martin Luther's Reply to Erasmus of Rotterdam. J.I. Packer and O. R. Johnston, trans. Old Tappan, New Jersey: Fleming H. Revell Co., 1957.
Erasmus, Desiderius and Martin Luther. Luther and Erasmus: Free Will and Salvation. The Library of Christian Classics: Ichthus Edition. Rupp, E. Gordon; Marlow, A.N.; Watson, Philip S.; and Drewery, B. trans. and eds. Philadelphia: Westminster Press, 1969. (This volume provides an English translation of both Erasmus' De Libero Arbitrio and Luther's De Servo Arbitrio.)
Career of the Reformer III. Luther's Works, Vol. 33 of 55. Watson, Philip S. and Benjamin Drewery, trans. Philadelphia: Fortress Press, 1972.

External links

Bondage of the Will, by Martin Luther, translated by Henry Cole, London, March, 1823.
 

Works by Martin Luther
Philosophy books
1525 books
1525 in Christianity
16th-century Christian texts